Robert Niederkirchner (6 June 1924 – 2004) was a German footballer who played for SV Saar 05 Saarbrücken and the Saarland national team as a forward.

References

1924 births
2004 deaths
German footballers
Saar footballers
Saarland international footballers
Saarland B international footballers
SV Saar 05 Saarbrücken players
Association football forwards